Colombian Air Force One abbreviated FAC-0001 is the registration number and indicative that gives air traffic control to the main plane at the service of the President of Colombia, a Boeing 737-700 with the Boeing Business Jet configuration. It is also known by the name "República de Colombia 1" . It is internationally recognized for being one of the few militarized presidential aircraft with a NATO E-4 status, which represents the highest level of protection. It is monitored by Israeli and American satellites, in addition to having a fourth degree nuclear ballistic capacity.

History
Over time, Colombia has had several aircraft at the service of the president of Colombia. The first Colombian ruler to fly in an 0airplane during his tenure was Pedro Nel Ospina for an official mission in August 1922.

First presidential aircraft
In 1933, the first aircraft entered service, the FAC 625 Junkers Ju-52-3M, which made its maiden voyage with President Enrique Olaya Herrera. This German-made aircraft had a capacity for three crew members and 20 passengers. It was used until 1950 transporting Enrique Olaya Herrera, Alfonso López Pumarejo, Eduardo Santos and Mariano Ospina Pérez.

As an alternative to this plane, the Douglas C-47 Skytrain FAC 660 used by the presidents Gustavo Rojas Pinilla, Alberto Lleras Camargo, Guillermo León Valencia and Carlos Lleras Restrepo was also used. Similarly, a Lockheed C-60 Lodestar FAC 654 used by Alfonso López Pumarejo.

In 1954 came the Douglas C-54 Skymaster FAC 613, later numbered FAC 690, manufactured in the United States. He served in the terms of General Gustavo Rojas Pinilla, Alberto Lleras Camargo, Guillermo León Valencia, Carlos Lleras Restrepo and Misael Pastrana Borrero. He retired in 1971.

Fokker F-28
The third presidential plane that the Air Force had was the Fokker F-28, which entered service on February 19, 19712 and whose manufacturer is the Dutch company Fokker. It was used, among other missions, to transport the remains of former President Guillermo León Valencia, from New York to Popayán. He served the presidents Misael Pastrana Borrero, Alfonso López Michelsen, Julio César Turbay, Belisario Betancur, Virgilio Barco, César Gaviria, Ernesto Samper, Andrés Pastrana and Álvaro Uribe Vélez.

In 1986, during his visit to Colombia, Pope John Paul II traveled to various places on this plane, which is why the pontiff's coat of arms was painted next to that of Colombia and the FAC.

In 2005, the FARC guerrilla group tried to attack this aircraft when President Álvaro Uribe Vélez was going to land in Neiva, but the attack was discovered minutes before landing.

Currently this plane has the registration FAC 0002 and transports the vice president and senior government officials.

Boenig 707
The FAC 1201, also known as Zeus is a Boeing 707 and it was incorporated into the fleet in 1983, to be used as a presidential plane on international and transatlantic flights. The entry into service of this aircraft made up for the limitations that the Fokker 28 had in terms of flight autonomy and performance of its turbines.

This plane transported Presidents Belisario Betancur, Virgilio Barco, César Gaviria, Ernesto Samper, Andrés Pastrana and Álvaro Uribe abroad.

Boenig KC-767
The FAC 1202, also known as Jupiter was acquired during the government of Juan Manuel Santos. It is a Boeing KC-767 with a capacity of up to 210 people and it cost 40 million dollars. It was incorporated in 2013 to replace the FAC 1201 “Zeus”, for international flights, such as Santos' trip to Oslo, Norway to receive the Nobel Peace Prize, in 2016, and that of Iván Duque Márquez to the COP26 summit in Glasgow, Scotland, in 2021.3 It also serves as a tanker, cargo plane and for humanitarian missions, such as the one in 2020, in which it was sent to China to repatriate Colombians who had been trapped at the beginning of the health emergency due to COVID-19

Boeing Business Jet
Given the obvious mechanical wear on the Fokker F-28 after more than 30 years of service, the process to acquire a new presidential plane for Colombia began in October 2002. For this, the Colombian Air Force studied various proposals submitted by companies in the sector. aerospace from Canada, Brazil, France, the United States and the European Airbus consortium.

For 2004, you had to choose between two aircraft: the Boeing Business Jet, which is a modified version of the commercial version of the Boeing 737 specifically for large corporations and governments, and the Airbus A319 ACJ. The Colombian government finally decided on the Boeing Business Jet of US origin, and the purchase was made directly. The selected aircraft had originally been built in 1999 for an Arab sheikh, who later canceled the order. It only had 22 flight hours at the time of purchase.

The cost was close to 40 million dollars, of which 29 million corresponded to the plane as such and the rest was invested in its internal adaptation.

This aircraft has served the presidents Álvaro Uribe, Juan Manuel Santos, Iván Duque and the current president Gustavo Petro

See also

References

Notes

Bibliography

External links

1933 establishments in Colombia
Junkers aircraft
Fokker aircraft
Boeing 707
Boeing 767
Boeing 737
Call signs
Presidential aircraft
Raymond Loewy
Colombian Air Force